Apple 98.5FM (official call sign 3APL) is a community radio station licensed to Bacchus Marsh, Victoria.

History
The first test broadcast of this station in October 1986 coincided with the celebrations for the 150th year since the founding of Bacchus Marsh township. The original frequency offered was 94.7FM with call sign 3APL. One week only was granted for broadcasting.
The ‘studio’ was in the garage of a real estate office in Underbank.

The station's establishment followed the dedicated and energetic efforts of founding member David Steele, a Bacchus Marsh resident and radio broadcasting enthusiast, who had invited expressions of interest in a local newspaper advertisement.

With the assistance of a team of 20 plus willing volunteers, donated equipment and funds, the station underwent many changes in venue:- the local grammar school, the community centre, the local post office, the public hall, a Main Street building above a chemist, an annex of the Montessori kindergarten in Darley to the current home, the Community Hub, thanks to the support of the Moorabool council.

After various test broadcasts of 2 weeks, 3 times per year, it was not until 2001 that a full license was granted to Apple 98.5FM with 200+ members. Even then, broadcasting times were limited.

All presenters being voluntary, shows have included breakfast programmes, news, sports, Community announcements a wide variety of music and even overnight broadcasts.

Though a turntable still exists, vinyl records, cassettes and cartridges have since given way to CDs and ultimately USB connections as the main music source. Outside broadcasts are an innovative feature of the station's progress. 24/7 broadcasting is well in place now.

Apple 98.5FM is also involved in various local community projects and festivals. The local Ballarat League Football competition is a major draw card on the station’s calendar, with hundreds tuning in yearly to catch Apple’s live play by play commentary of both the Darley Devils and Bacchus Marsh Cobras during football season, featuring local sports writer Todd Whelan. 

In addition to the Saturday Game Day broadcast, Apple 98.5FM also produces a live to air round preview talk show titled ‘The Presser’ airing on Wednesday nights. Todd is joined by Wayne Freeman in-studio throughout the season, alongside of league coaches and other special identities from the BFNL.

The incorporated committee, with President Karolyn Dangar meet monthly apart from the AGM and subcommittee meetings. Much structural and technical work is performed by members.

The station now has a professional development strategy for presenters and will also provide training in radio programming and presentation to prospective local students.

Membership fees and contributions, Sponsors’ donations are vital but insufficient to fully develop the station's future and reach the wider community.

Notable alumni

 Claire Stuchbery, host of "Firewater" on PBS 106.7FM Melbourne.
 Matilda Marozzi, journalist and producer at ABC Radio Melbourne.
 Michael Clough, commentator for Foxtel's broadcasts of the Australian Ice Hockey League.

References

External links
Official website

Community radio stations in Australia
Radio stations in Melbourne
Radio stations established in 2001